Mendham Township is a township in Morris County, in the central portion of northern New Jersey, United States, located more than  due west of New York City. As of the 2020 United States census, the township's population was 6,016, an increase of 147 (+2.5%) from the 2010 census count of 5,869, which in turn reflected an increase of 469 (+8.7%) from the 5,400 counted in the 2000 census.

It is part of the New York metropolitan area, as well as the larger New York–Newark–Bridgeport, NY-NJ-CT-PA Combined Statistical Area. The township may be named for Mendham, Suffolk, England, or it may derive from the Native American word mendom (meaning "raspberry") or for an Earl of Mendham.

The long-established hamlets of Brookside and Ralston are located within the township and both are listed among the National Register of Historic Places.

Along with Mendham Borough, the Mendhams have been described by The New York Times as "both affluent". The township has been one of the highest-income small municipalities in the United States. Based on data from the 2012-2016 American Community Survey, NJ.com ranked the township as having the third-highest income in the state, with a median household income of $176,875. Based on data from the ACS for 2014–2018, Mendham Township ranked fifth in the state with a median household income of $185,882.

In 2010, Forbes.com listed Mendham as 224th in its listing of "America's Most Expensive ZIP Codes", with a median home price of $1,006,491.

History

The township was originally formed on March 29, 1749, from portions of Hanover Township, Morris Township and Roxbury Township. After the Revolutionary War, on February 21, 1798, the township was incorporated by the Township Act of 1798 of the New Jersey Legislature as one of the state's initial group of 104 townships. Portions of the township were taken to create Randolph Township on January 1, 1806. Mendham Borough became an independent municipality when it was formed on May 15, 1906.

The first settlers were attracted to Mendham Township by the abundance of natural resources. Here they found water to power factories, trees for fuel, and rich deposits of ore. By 1748 the area housed iron forges, sawmills, and a gristmill along the North Branch of the Raritan River. This early settlement became known as Ralston, after the enterprising Ralston family. Northeast of Ralston is India Brook. On the eastern side of Mendham Township, brooks that formed the upper reaches of the Whippany River attracted settlers to the valley called Water Street or Waterville, later known as Brookside.

Following the Civil War, a trend of wealthy industrialists and financiers established country homes in the Morristown area and Bernardsville's "Mountain Colony", including in the Mendhams. The community retains its early character through its carefully preserved homes, farm buildings, and villages. These are living remnants of the township's past.  Here people worked where they lived in a natural setting, away from the "dark satanic mills" of the big city, "pursuing economic independence – a portrait of Americana", according to the town's website.

Geography
According to the United States Census Bureau, the township had a total area of 18.01 square miles (46.65 km2), including 17.78 square miles (46.06 km2) of land and 0.23 square miles (0.59 km2) of water (1.27%).

Unincorporated communities, localities and place names located partially or completely within the township include Brookside, Colemans Hollow, Days Mills, Pleasant Valley, Ralston and Washington Corner.

The long-established hamlets of Brookside and Ralston are located within the township and both are listed among the National Register of Historic Places.

The township surrounds Mendham Borough on three sides and borders Morris Township to the east, Harding Township to the southeast, Randolph to the north and Chester Township to the west all of which are located in Morris County; Bernardsville lies to the south and Peapack-Gladstone lies to the southwest, both located in the Somerset Hills of Somerset County.

Located near Jockey Hollow along Kennaday Road lies the Mendham Golf and Tennis Club.

Demographics

2010 census

The Census Bureau's 2006–2010 American Community Survey showed that (in 2010 inflation-adjusted dollars) median household income was $162,125 (with a margin of error of +/− $44,498) and the median family income was $194,028 (+/− $20,875). Males had a median income of $163,594 (+/− $46,204) versus $76,136 (+/− $53,301) for females. The per capita income for the borough was $93,011 (+/− $10,203). About 0.6% of families and 1.7% of the population were below the poverty line, including 1.2% of those under age 18 and none of those age 65 or over.

Mendham Township is one of the highest-income small municipalities in the United States and was ranked 7th in New Jersey in per capita income as of the 2010 Census. Based on data from the 2006-2010 American Community Survey, the township had a per capita income of $93,011 (ranked 7th in the state), compared to per capita income in Morris County of $47,342 and statewide of $34,858.

2000 census
As of the 2000 United States census there were 5,400 people, 1,788 households, and 1,539 families residing in the township.  The population density was 302.4 people per square mile (116.7/km2).  There were 1,849 housing units at an average density of 103.5 per square mile (40.0/km2).  The racial makeup of the township was 95.91% White, 0.93% African American, 0.09% Native American, 2.02% Asian, 0.35% from other races, and 0.70% from two or more races. Hispanic or Latino of any race were 1.52% of the population.

There were 1,788 households, out of which 47.0% had children under the age of 18 living with them, 80.2% were married couples living together, 4.0% had a female householder with no husband present, and 13.9% were non-families. 11.1% of all households were made up of individuals, and 4.6% had someone living alone who was 65 years of age or older. The average household size was 3.01 and the average family size was 3.27.

In the township the population was spread out, with 32.0% under the age of 18, 3.6% from 18 to 24, 23.8% from 25 to 44, 29.9% from 45 to 64, and 10.8% who were 65 years of age or older. The median age was 40 years. For every 100 females, there were 96.8 males. For every 100 females age 18 and over, there were 94.1 males.

The median income for a household in the township was $136,174, and the median income for a family was $146,254. Males had a median income of $100,000 versus $57,946 for females. The per capita income for the township was $61,460.  About 1.4% of families and 1.8% of the population were below the poverty line, including 2.3% of those under age 18 and 0.9% of those age 65 or over.

Mendham Township was ranked in 2000 as the 17th highest-income community in the state of New Jersey based on per capita income, after having been ranked tenth a decade earlier. In 2000, the township's median household income ranked forth in the state and second highest in Morris County behind Mountain Lakes. Per capita income increased by 30.4% from the previous census, with income growth ranked 493rd among the state's 566 municipalities.

Parks and recreation

In addition to the several parks in the township, there are miles of hiking trails, including the Patriots' Path, created by the county. India Brook Park, located off Ironia Road, has recreation fields and features a trail to Buttermilk Falls on the India Brook. The Schiff Nature Preserve, located off Pleasant Valley Road, offers nature programs and has several hiking trails.

Government

Local government
Mendham Township operates under the township form of New Jersey municipal government, one of 141 municipalities (of the 564) statewide that use this form, the second most commonly used form of government in the state. The Township Committee is comprised of five members, who are elected directly by the voters at-large in partisan elections to serve three-year terms of office on a staggered basis, with either one or two seats coming up for election each year as part of the November general election in a three-year cycle. At an annual reorganization meeting held on the first Monday after January 1, the newly reconstituted township committee selects one of its members to serve as mayor, and another to serve as deputy mayor.

, members of the Mendham Township Committee are Mayor Nick Monaghan (R, term on committee ends December 3, 2024; term as mayor ends 2023), Deputy Mayor Sarah Neibart (R, term on committee ends 2024; term as deputy mayor ends 2023), Amalia Duarte (D, 2023), Tracy Moreen (R, 2025) and Lauren Spirig (D, 2025).

In February 2023, Republicans dropped a challenge to the election of Democrat Lauren Spirig, who was awarded the second seat up for election, two votes ahead of incumbent Republican committee member Thomas Baio, who claimed that there had been 33 votes that had been cast by individuals who no longer resided in the township and were thus ineligible to vote.

Former township committeeman Brian Phelan was inducted into the New Jersey State Elected Officials Hall of Fame in 2011.

Federal, state, and county representation
Mendham Township is located in the 7th and 11th Congressional Districts and is part of New Jersey's 25th state legislative district.

  

Morris County is governed by a Board of County Commissioners comprised of seven members who are elected at-large in partisan elections to three-year terms on a staggered basis, with either one or three seats up for election each year as part of the November general election. Actual day-to-day operation of departments is supervised by County Administrator, John Bonanni. , Morris County's Commissioners are
Commissioner Director Tayfun Selen (R, Chatham Township, term as commissioner ends December 31, 2023; term as director ends 2022),
Commissioner Deputy Director John Krickus (R, Washington Township, term as commissioner ends 2024; term as deputy director ends 2022),
Douglas Cabana (R, Boonton Township, 2022), 
Kathryn A. DeFillippo (R, Roxbury, 2022),
Thomas J. Mastrangelo (R, Montville, 2022),
Stephen H. Shaw (R, Mountain Lakes, 2024) and
Deborah Smith (R, Denville, 2024).
The county's constitutional officers are the County Clerk and County Surrogate (both elected for five-year terms of office) and the County Sheriff (elected for a three-year term). , they are 
County Clerk Ann F. Grossi (R, Parsippany–Troy Hills, 2023),
Sheriff James M. Gannon (R, Boonton Township, 2022) and
Surrogate Heather Darling (R, Roxbury, 2024).

Politics
As of June 4, 2019, there were a total of 5,051 registered voters in Mendham Township, of which 1,114 (22.0%) were registered as Democrats, 2,119 (41.9%) were registered as Republicans and 1,788 (35.4%) were registered as Unaffiliated.

In the 2016 presidential election, Republican Donald Trump received 49.5% of the vote (1,776 cast), ahead of Democrat Hillary Clinton with 44.7% (1,603 votes), and other candidates with 5.8% (208 votes), among the 3,640 ballots cast by the township's 5,002 registered voters, for a turnout of 72.8%. In the 2012 presidential election, Republican Mitt Romney received 64.5% of the vote (2,108 cast), ahead of Democrat Barack Obama with 34.6% (1,130 votes), and other candidates with 0.9% (28 votes), among the 3,279 ballots cast by the township's 4,691 registered voters (13 ballots were spoiled), for a turnout of 69.9%. In the 2008 presidential election, Republican John McCain received 58.1% of the vote (2,080 cast), ahead of Democrat Barack Obama with 40.8% (1,461 votes) and other candidates with 0.6% (21 votes), among the 3,581 ballots cast by the township's 4,608 registered voters, for a turnout of 77.7%. In the 2004 presidential election, Republican George W. Bush received 62.4% of the vote (2,203 ballots cast), outpolling Democrat John Kerry with 36.7% (1,296 votes) and other candidates with 0.4% (20 votes), among the 3,532 ballots cast by the township's 4,529 registered voters, for a turnout percentage of 78.0.

In the 2017 gubernatorial election, Republican Kim Guadagno received 57.5% (1,305 votes), ahead of Democrat Phil Murphy with 41.1% (932 votes), and other candidates with 1.4% (31 votes), among the 2,292 ballots cast by the township's 4,982 registered voters, for a turnout of 46.0%. In the 2013 gubernatorial election, Republican Chris Christie, a resident of the township, received 80.9% of the vote (1,795 cast), ahead of Democrat Barbara Buono with 18.0% (400 votes), and other candidates with 1.1% (25 votes), among the 2,242 ballots cast by the township's 4,624 registered voters (22 ballots were spoiled), for a turnout of 48.5%. In the 2009 gubernatorial election, Republican Chris Christie received 67.4% of the vote (1,914 ballots cast), ahead of  Democrat Jon Corzine with 23.5% (666 votes), Independent Chris Daggett with 8.0% (227 votes) and other candidates with 0.1% (3 votes), among the 2,838 ballots cast by the township's 4,547 registered voters, yielding a 62.4% turnout.

Education
Public school students in pre-kindergarten through eighth grade attend the Mendham Township Public Schools. As of the 2020–21 school year, the district, comprised of two schools, had an enrollment of 745 students and 73.9 classroom teachers (on an FTE basis), for a student–teacher ratio of 10.1:1. Schools in the district (with 2020–2021 enrollment data from the National Center for Education Statistics) are 
Mendham Township Elementary School with 429 students in grades Pre-K–4 and 
Mendham Township Middle School with 313 students in grades 5–8.

Mendham Township Middle School was one of 11 in the state to be recognized in 2014 by the United States Department of Education's National Blue Ribbon Schools Program. Mendham Township Elementary School was honored by the National Blue Ribbon Schools Program in 2019, one of nine schools in the state recognized as Exemplary High Performing Schools.

Students in public school for ninth through twelfth grades attend West Morris Mendham High School, which is located in Mendham Borough and serves students from Chester Borough, Chester Township, Mendham Borough and Mendham Township. The school is part of the West Morris Regional High School District, which also serves students from Washington Township at West Morris Central High School. As of the 2020–21 school year, the high school had an enrollment of 1,142 students and 91.9 classroom teachers (on an FTE basis), for a student–teacher ratio of 12.4:1. The district's board of education is comprised nine members who are elected directly by voters to serve three-year terms of office on a staggered basis. The nine seats on the board of education are allocated based on the populations of the constituent municipalities, with one seat assigned to Mendham Township.

Transportation

Roads and highways

No Interstate, U.S. or state highways pass directly through Mendham Township. The most significant roadway directly serving the township is County Route 510. For those heading to points outside the township, Interstate 287, Interstate 80, and Interstate 78, are all accessible nearby.

Public transportation
NJ Transit offered service on the MCM4 and MCM5 routes until 2010, when subsidies to the local provider were eliminated as part of budget cuts.

Commuters traveling via public transportation can drive to the Morristown station to access New Jersey Transit Midtown Direct express train line into Midtown Manhattan.

Notable people

People who were born in, residents of, or otherwise closely associated with Mendham Township include:

 Chris Christie (born 1962), former New Jersey Governor and United States Attorney
 Samuel Cochran (1871–1952), medical missionary and philanthropist who worked for over 20 years in Eastern China
 Peter Dinklage (born 1969), Emmy and Golden Globe-winning actor who starred in The Station Agent, Elf and Game of Thrones
 Abner Doubleday (1819–1893), Civil War general and purported inventor of baseball
 Morris Frank (1908–1980), co-founder of The Seeing Eye
 William "Green Bar Bill" Hillcourt (1900–1992), author and national official of the Boy Scouts of America, at nearby Schiff Scout Reservation from the 1930s to the 1970s
 Whitney Houston (1963–2012), singer
 Rick Merkt (born 1949) represented the 25th Legislative District in the New Jersey General Assembly from 1998 to 2010
 Anne M. Patterson (born 1959), Associate Justice of the New Jersey Supreme Court
 Stewart G. Pollock (born 1933), Justice of the Supreme Court of New Jersey from 1979 to 1999
 Arthur Whitney (1871–1942), politician who served in both houses of the New Jersey Legislature and was the Republican nominee for Governor of New Jersey in 1925.
 Temperance Wick (1758–1822), American Revolutionary War heroine

References

External links

Mendham Township website
Mendham Township Public Schools

Mendham Township Public Schools, National Center for Education Statistics
West Morris Mendham High School
West Morris Regional High School District

 
1749 establishments in New Jersey
Populated places established in 1749
Township form of New Jersey government
Townships in Morris County, New Jersey